John Bradley West (born 15 September 1988) is an English actor, best known for his role as Samwell Tarly in the HBO fantasy TV series Game of Thrones.

Early life
Bradley was born in September 1988. He grew up as a Catholic in the Wythenshawe district of south Manchester and attended St Paul's Roman Catholic High School. He has a sister who is 13 years older than he is.

In 2005, he began attending Loreto College in the Hulme area of Manchester, where he studied Drama and Theatre Studies. He graduated from Loreto in 2007. He received a BA in acting at the Manchester School of Theatre, graduating in 2010.

Career
Three months after he graduated from drama school, in his first audition Bradley won the part of Samwell Tarly in the 2011 HBO fantasy TV series Game of Thrones, whom he would play for all 8 seasons of the show. His character is a friend of Kit Harington's Jon Snow and provides occasional comic relief, especially in season 1. As the series progressed, Bradley's Tarly developed significantly. One reviewer called him "a wonderful comedic and cowardly yin to Jon's dour yang". George R. R. Martin said that the character that Bradley portrays is the character he would be, if he were on the show.

In 2011, Bradley appeared in the Canal+ drama, Borgia, in the role of Pope Leo X, Giovanni di Lorenzo de' Medici. In 2012, he played the character Tyr Seward in the BBC production of Merlin in series 5, in the episode "A Lesson in Vengeance". The same year, he appeared on the Channel 4 TV series Shameless in the role of Wesley, Frank Gallagher's boss, in two episodes of series 10. In 2015, Bradley played the role of Miloš Hrma in the BBC Radio Salford radio play production of Closely Observed Trains.

In 2018, Bradley appeared as Scooter in the film Patient Zero, with fellow Game of Thrones performer Natalie Dormer. In 2022, he was one of the leads in the 2022 Roland Emmerich disaster film Moonfall and played a supporting role in the romantic comedy Marry Me, starring Jennifer Lopez and Owen Wilson.

Personal life
Bradley is a supporter of Manchester United F.C.

Bradley plays the drums.

Filmography

Film

Television

Video games

References

External links

 
 

Living people
1988 births
English male television actors
English male film actors
21st-century English male actors
People from Wythenshawe
Alumni of Manchester Metropolitan University
Male actors from Manchester